is a former Japanese footballer who played as a defender.

References

Living people
1979 births
Japanese footballers
Albirex Niigata Singapore FC players
Singapore Premier League players
Expatriate footballers in Thailand

Association football defenders